Birgitta Valberg (16 December 1916 – 29 March 2014) was a Swedish actress.  She was best known for her work in several Ingmar Bergman films made over a 30-year period, including the Bergman produced Paradise Place (1977). For her role in this film, which was directed by Gunnel Lindblom, another member of Bergman's repertory company, she won the award for Best Actress at the 13th Guldbagge Awards.

She trained at the Royal Dramatic Training Academy.

Filmography

Film

1934: Unga hjärtan - Ingrid
1939: The People of Högbogården - Young Woman
1939: Melodin från Gamla Stan - Woman at the restaurant (uncredited)
1941: In Paradise - Marianne
1941: The Fight Continues - Nurse
1942: Bambi - Bambi's Mother (Swedish dub)
1943: Life in the Country - Frida von Rambow
1948: Port of Call - Mrs. Vilander
1949: Love Wins Out - Schwester Erika
1951: Divorced - Eva Möller
1953: Barabbas - Veronica from Cyrene (uncredited)
1953: House of Women - Vera
1954: Flottans glada gossar - Olga Ekman
1954:Taxi 13 - Britt-Marie
1954: Karin Månsdotter - Queen Dowager
1955: Farligt löfte - Irma Strand
1955: Smiles of a Summer Night - Actress
1956: The Staffan Stolle Story - Fru Lefverhielm
1956: Sista natten - The Man's Wife
1957: Synnöve Solbakken - Karen Solbakken
1958: Miss April - Ms. Holm, secretary
1959: Sleeping Beauty - Maleficent (Swedish dub)
1960: The Virgin Spring - Märeta
1960: Heart's Desire - Henriette Löwenflycht
1962: The Mistress - The Motherly (uncredited)
1964: Svenska bilder - Mrs. Lundberg
1965: För vänskaps skull - Nun
1966: The Princess - Doctor
1968: Shame - fru Jacobi
1969: Som natt och dag - Cecilia
1970: Storia di una donna - Mrs. Ullman
1976: The Man on the Roof - Mrs. Nyman
1977: Paradise Place - Katha
1980: Flygnivå 450 - Hedvall
1988: Ingen rövare finns i skogen (Short) - Mormor
1989: Peter och Petra - Grandmother
1992: Sunday's Children - Grandmother

Television
1955: Hamlet (TV Movie) - Drottning Gertrud
1961: Han som fick leva om sitt liv (TV Movie) - Anna
1961: Mr Ernest (TV Movie) - Lady Bracknall
1961: En handelsresandes död (TV Movie) - Linda Loman
1961: Ljuva ungdomstid (TV Movie) - Essie, Nat's wife
1962: Sex roller söka en författare (TV Movie) - Madame Paix
1968: Rötter (TV Movie) - Mrs. Bryant
1973: Näsan (TV Movie) - Sven's wife
1973: Pelikanen (TV Movie) - The mother
1973: En skugga (TV Movie) - Vera's mother
1979: En handelsresandes död (TV Movie) - Linda Loman
1980: Räkan från Maxim (TV Movie) - Hertiginnan de Valmonté
1986: Studierektorns sista strid - Agnes
1990: S*M*A*S*H - Tant Sporrhane
1990-1991: Storstad - Maria Zimmermann
1993: Polisen och domarmordet - Frideborg Glans
1995: Snoken - Margit Edström
1996: Idlaflickorna (TV Movie) - Galen Fru (final film role)

References

Further reading

External links

1916 births
2014 deaths
Swedish film actresses
Swedish stage actresses
Actresses from Stockholm
Eugene O'Neill Award winners
Litteris et Artibus recipients
Best Actress Guldbagge Award winners